A busser (busboy or busgirl) is someone who assists the waiting staff in the restaurant and catering industry.

Busboy may also refer to:

TV
 Busboy Productions, a television production company
 "The Busboy", a Seinfeld episode

Music
 The BusBoys, a musical group